Umalwad is a small village having population 5035  as on 2011 census survey of govt of India. It is situated 3 km from north side of Jaysingpur city. This village is famous for Guava. Every year on Mahashivratri Shree Danling Maharaj yatra or festival is celebrated. The history of the village dates back into the year 1600-1700 old. It is situated on the bank of Krishna River which flows from north to south, as it flows in Nrusinhwadi.  This village is also famous for its all religions temples present in the village. In Umalwad there is Ramling Temple, Shree Danling temple, Shree Hanuman temple, Shree Vitthal-Rukmini Temple, Shree Basaveshwar temple, Shree Ganapati temple and a Christian church is also present.

Language
Marathi is a local and official language of Umalwad. All practices, facilities, education is given in Marathi in Umalwad. Most of the people speak, write and read Marathi. Few people can speak Kannada language also, who belongs to Jain and Lingayat community.

Location
Umalwad is situated at 16°48'12.2 N & 74°32'47.2 E, which is on North side of Jaysingpur city.

Festivals 
The big festival celebrated in umalwad is Shri Danling  Maharaj Yatra celebrated every year on Maha Shivaratri. The second festival celebrated is Shri Hanuman Jayanti. Third Festival celebrated is Shri Birdev Yatra. Shri Mahavir Jayanti is also celebrated every year by Jain people. The one more big festival celebrated every year is Dr. Babasaheb Ambedkar Birth Celebrations.

Temples
Shri Danling Maharaj Temple
Shri Ramling Temple
Shri Jain Basti
Shri Birdev Temple
Shri Basveshwar Temple
Shri Hanuman Temple
Shri Vitthal Rukmini Temple
Shri Ganpati Temple
Buddha Temple
 (K.D.C.,C.N.I.) church Umalwad

References

Villages in Kolhapur district